Erin King (born 21 October 2003) is an Irish Rugby Union player who plays for the Irish Rugby Sevens national team.

Early life
Erin was born in Sydney, Australia to parents James and Joanne. She has four brothers - Daniel, Matty, Conor, and Liam. She also lived with her family in Dubai and Doha. The family moved back to Wicklow in Ireland for Erin’s teenage years. Erin played for Leinster and Ireland U18 rugby union sides. She plays her club rugby for Old Belvedere RFC.

Career
Erin made her debut for the Ireland team at the Dubai Sevens in December 2021, after being identified as a Player of National Interest at the age of 17 and joining the Ireland Sevens program in January 2021. Erin played an important role in the Irish women’s team becoming the first ever to win a World Series silver medal in February 2022, in Spain. Erin scored her first tries for Ireland in a 22-21 win against Canada at the French HSBC World Rugby Sevens Series event in Toulouse in May 2022. She was named in the Ireland squad for the 2022 Rugby World Cup Sevens – Women's tournament held in Cape Town, South Africa in September 2022.

References

2003 births
Living people
Ireland international women's rugby sevens players
Rugby union players from County Wicklow